Burudi Nabwera is a Kenyan politician and former ambassador. In the 1960s he served as ambassador to the United States and permanent representative at the United Nations before retiring from the diplomatic service to enter politics. In 1988, he was elected as a member of parliament representing the Lugari Constituency in Western Province of Kenya. He lost that seat to Apili Wawire in the 1992 elections, and retired from politics. In 2007 Nabwera was named chairman of the Nzoia Sugar company in Bungoma, Kenya for a three-year term. He was replaced in 2010 by Julius Nyarotso. He was one of the kingpins during the kleptocracy and dictatorship of the Moi era. He was also the prime mover in the torture and beatings of the mothers of political prisoners peace demonstration at the all saints cathedral.

References

Year of birth missing (living people)
Living people
Kenyan diplomats
Ambassadors of Kenya to the United States
Members of the National Assembly (Kenya)
Permanent Representatives of Kenya to the United Nations